Gillian Stroudley née Thain (1925–1992) was an English painter and printmaker.

Life and work
Gillian Stroudley was born Gillian Thain in Epsom, Surrey in 1925. She studied painting and wood engraving at St. Martin's School of Art between 1945-1951 under the supervision of Gertrude Hermes and Clifford Webb. After graduating, she worked as an art teacher for the Inner London Education Authority and also as a freelance textile designer. An extremely talented printmaker, her etchings were exhibited at the Royal Academy, London and are also found in the collections of the National Library and Museum of Wales.

She married the artist James Stroudley, they had two sons and one daughter.

Exhibitions
Gillian exhibited the etchings The Copse and Angle Church at High Water in the Large South Room of The Royal Academy in 1995, alongside Sir Hugh Casson and Diana Armfield.

References

20th-century English painters
English etchers
1925 births
1992 deaths
20th-century British printmakers